This is a list of notable women, either famous themselves or closely associated with someone well known, who suffered maternal death as defined by the World Health Organization (WHO):

"the death of a woman while pregnant or within 42 days of termination of pregnancy, irrespective of the duration and site of the pregnancy, from any cause related to or aggravated by the pregnancy or its management but not from accidental or incidental causes."

Note that this wording includes abortion, miscarriage, stillbirth, and ectopic pregnancy. Generally, there is a distinction between a direct maternal death that is the result of a complication of the pregnancy, delivery, or management of the two, and an indirect maternal death that is a pregnancy-related death in a woman with a pre-existing or newly developed health problem unrelated to pregnancy. Fatalities during but unrelated to a pregnancy are termed accidental, incidental, or non-obstetrical maternal deaths.

However, the WHO definition is only one of many; other definitions may include accidental and incidental causes. Cases with "incidental causes" include deaths secondary to violence against women that may be related to the pregnancy and be affected by the socioeconomic and cultural environment. Also, it has been reported that about 10% of maternal deaths may occur late, that is after 42 days after a termination or delivery; thus, some definitions extend the period of observation to one year after the end of gestation.

Women by country

Angola
Ivone Mufuca (2016), handball player

Australia
Elizabeth Jane Hunter (1857), maternal aunt of Gustave Slapoffski (she died in England)
Hattie Shepparde (1874), first wife of Henry Hallam
Daphne Akhurst (1933), five time consecutive winner of women's singles title at the Australian Championships from 1925 to 1930.
Doreen Harrison (1953), mother of serial killer Catherine Birnie.
Rona Glynn (1965)

Austria
Joanna of Austria (1578), Grand Duchess of Tuscany
Anna of Austria, Queen of Spain (1580)
Margaret of Austria (1611), Queen of Spain and Portugal
Maria Anna of Spain (1646), youngest daughter of King Philip III of Spain and Margaret of Austria, who also died in childbirth
Maria Leopoldine of Austria (1649), Holy Roman Empress and Queen of Hungary and Bohemia
Maria Antonia of Austria (1692), first wife of Maximilian II Emanuel, Elector of Bavaria
Maria Anna of Austria (1744)
Elisabeth of Württemberg (1790), Archduchess of Austria
Princess Hermine of Anhalt-Bernburg-Schaumburg-Hoym (1817), Archduchess of Austria
the first wife of Johann Georg Hiedler (1824)
Maria Leopoldina of Austria (1826), Empress of Brazil and Queen of Portugal
Christine Ponthieure de Berlaere (1837), first wife of Louis Antoine Debrauz de Saldapenna
Adelaide of Austria (1855), first wife of Victor Emmanuel II of Sardinia, future King of Italy
Anna Schapire (1911), writer and translator, and first wife of Otto Neurath 
Nora Kinsky (1923), mother of Countess Georgina von Wilczek
Archduchess Helena of Austria (1924)
Bettina Strauss (1942), sister of Leo Strauss, second wife of Paul Kraus and mother of Jenny Strauss Clay

Belarus
Sophia Olelkovich Radziwill (1612)
The mother of Ivan Kulesh (1986)

Belgium
Fernande de Cartier de Marchienne (1903), mother of Marguerite Yourcenar

Bohemia
Judith of Bohemia (1086), Duchess of Poland
Judith of Habsburg (1297), Queen of Bohemia
Margaret of Bohemia (1322), daughter of Wenceslaus II of Bohemia and Judith of Habsburg, who also died in childbirth
Agnes of Bohemia, Duchess of Jawor (1337)
Kunigunde of Sternberg (1449), days after she delivered twins, Catherine of Poděbrady (who later died of childbirth) and Sidonie
Catherine of Poděbrady (1464), Bohemian princess, Queen of Hungary
Anne of Foix-Candale (1506), Bohemian princess, Queen of Hungary, mother of Anne of Bohemia and Hungary, who later died in childbirth.
Anna of Bohemia and Hungary (1547), Bohemian Princess died while giving birth to Joanna of Austria, Grand Duchess of Tuscany, who later died in childbirth
Juliane Reichardt (1783), pianist

Bolivia
the mother of Domitila Chúngara (1946)

Bosnia and Herzegovina
 Barbara del Balzo (1459), second wife of Stjepan Vukčić Kosača

Brazil
 Ana Guilhermina Borges (1891), wife of Francisco de Paula Rodrigues Alves
 Francisca Chagas Pessoa (1895), first wife of Epitácio Pessoa
 Maria de Lurdes da Silva (1971), first wife of Luiz Inácio Lula da Silva

Bulgaria
Princess Marie Louise of Bourbon-Parma (1899), mother of Tsar Boris III of Bulgaria.

Burma
Mwei Daw (1368), principal queen of King Binnya U of Martaban–Hanthawaddy, and the mother of King Razadarit.
Shin Myo Myat (1520s), mother of King Bayinnaung of the Toungoo dynasty of Burma (Myanmar), and wet nurse of King Tabinshwehti.
Hsinbyume (1812), first wife of Bagyidaw.

Byzantine Empire 
Aelia Eudoxia (404), Empress consort of the Byzantine Emperor Arcadius
Tzitzak (750), first wife of Byzantine Emperor Constantine V 
Eudokia Baïana (901), third wife of Leo VI the Wise.
Irene Angelina (1208), Widow of Roger III of Sicily and Widow of Philip of Swabia, who died 2 months before her.
Caterina Gattilusio (1464)

Cambodia 
Sisowath Monikessan (1946), one of the wives of Norodom Sihanouk
Vichara Dany (1976), actress
Saom Vansodany (1977), actress
Chang My-Huoy (1978), only wife of Haing S. Ngor

Canada
Martha Minn (1790), first wife of John Howe (father of Joseph Howe)
the wife of Pierre St. Jean (1857)
the first wife of William Hobart Molson (1926)
Simmi Kahlon (2009), Indian-Canadian serial killer

China
Fu Hao (1200 BC), the consort of King Wu Ding of the Shang dynasty and, unusually for that time, also served as a military general and high priestess, and she is the mother of Prince Jie
Xu Pingjun (71 BC), Consort of Emperor Houshao of Han
Zhao Anzong (363), mother of Emperor Wu of Song
Empress Yujiulü (540), second and last Consort of Emperor Wen of Western Wei
Royal Consort Mo (618), Consort of Emperor Gaozu of Tang
Princess Yongtai (701), daughter of the Emperor Zhongzong of Tang dynasty and granddaughter of Empress Wu Zetian
Princess Huaiyang (704), daughter of the Emperor Ruizong of Tang
Princess Hezheng (764), daughter of the Emperor Suzong of Tang
Princess Hanzhenmu (784), daughter of the Emperor Dezong of Tang
Empress Wang (867), Consort of the Emperor Yizong of Tang and mother of Emperor Zhaozong of Tang.She was known as Empress Gongxian posthumously.
 Lady Chang (1378), wife of the Crown Prince Zhu Biao; posthumously known as Empress Xiaokang.
Empress Xiaojiesu (1528), first Empress Consort of the Jiajing Emperor of the Ming dynasty.
Amannisa Khan (1560)
Empress Dowager Xiaojing (1597), Consort of Wanli Emperor of the Ming dynasty, known as Consort Jing originally. She is the grandmother of Yongli Emperor of Southern Ming. She died while giving birth to his father Zhu Changying. And Yongli Emperor conferred her as Empress Dowager Xiaojing posthumously.
 Consort Yu of Zhang Clan (1623), Consort of Tianqi Emperor of the Ming dynasty
Empress Xiaochengren (1674), first Empress Consort of the Kangxi Emperor of the Qing dynasty
 Lady Lu (1677), wife of poet Nalan Xingde
Empress Xiaozhaoren (1678), second Empress Consort of the Kangxi Emperor of the Qing dynasty
Empress Xiaoyiren (1689), third Empress Consort of the Kangxi Emperor of the Qing dynasty
Princess Wenxian of the First Rank (1702), daughter of the Kangxi Emperor of the Qing dynasty.  
Princess Wenke of the Second Rank (1709), daughter of the Kangxi Emperor of the Qing dynasty.
Princess Dunke of the Second Rank (1710), daughter of the Kangxi Emperor of the Qing dynasty.
Princess Chunque of the First Rank (1710), daughter of the Kangxi Emperor of the Qing dynasty.
Noble Consort Xin (1764), Consort of the Qianlong Emperor of the Qing dynasty
 Concubine Jian (1783), Consort of Aisin Gioro Yongyan (later Jiaqing Emperor)
Anne Edith Baylis (1872), first wife of Henry Fletcher Hance (British diplomat and botanist)
 Gurun Princess Rong'an (1875), daughter of the Xianfeng Emperor of the Qing dynasty
 the mother of Du Yuesheng (1888)
 Aisin-Gioro Hengxin (1906), Biological mother of Empress Wanrong
 Shen Baoxiu (1918), first wife of Yun Daiying 
 Zhang Xiyuan (1930), first wife of Deng Xiaoping
Lu Yin (1934), writer
 Ren Yong-ping (1937), mother of Adeline Yen Mah
 Cai Weilian (1939), oil painter, daughter of philosopher Cai Yuanpei, wife of Lin Wenzheng.
 Shih Ching-i (1953), first wife of Chiang Wei-kuo.

Croatia
Dora Pejačević (1923), composer

Cuba
Caridad del Riesgo y Calero (1902), mother of Alfonso Bernal del Riesgo (his mother died a few days after giving birth, and his twin brother died a little earlier)

Czech
Elizabeth Jane Weston (1612), English-Czech poet

Denmark
Dagmar of Bohemia (1212), queen consort of King Valdemar II of Denmark. 
Eleanor of Portugal, Queen of Denmark (1231)
Charlotte Amalie Griffenfeld (1703), daughter of Peder Griffenfeld
Elisabeth Helene von Vieregg (1704), spouse of the king
Louise of Great Britain (1751), Queen of Denmark and Norway as first wife of Frederick V. She was the youngest surviving daughter of George II of Great Britain and Caroline of Ansbach.
Princess Louise of Denmark (1756)
Birgitte Sofie Gabel (1769)

Dominican Republic
María Albor Polanco (1772), mother of José Núñez de Cáceres

East Timor
Elsa Pinto (1981), first wife of Lere Anan Timor

Egypt
Henhenet (2015 BC), a lower ranking wife of Pharaoh Mentuhotep II of the 11th dynasty.
Meketaten (1340 BC) 
Mutnedjmet (13th century BC), wife of Pharaoh Horemheb
Cleopatra V (Mid 1st century BC)
Jamal Nur Qadin (1876)

Ethiopia
Woizero Zenebework Mikael (circa 1890), illegitimate granddaughter of Menelik II
Princess Tsehai (1942)
 Woizero Yitateku Kidane (1945), mother of Mengistu Haile Mariam

France
Matilda of Frisia (1044), second wife and first Queen of Henry I, King of the Franks
Sibylla of Burgundy (1150)
Constance of Castile (1160), second wife of Louis VII, King of France
Isabella of Hainault (1190), first wife of King Philip II of France died the day after giving birth to twins. Both twins lived for only 4 days.
Constance, Duchess of Brittany (1201)
Agnes of Merania (1201), queen of France 
Alix of Thouars (1221), Duchess of Brittany
Yolande of Dreux (1248), first wife of Hugh IV of Burgundy
Alice de Lusignan, Countess of Surrey (1256)
Margaret of France, Duchess of Brabant (1271), daughter of Louis IX of France and his wife Margaret of Provence
Joan I of Navarre (1305), Queen of Navarre, Countess of Champagne, and Queen of France
Beatrice of Luxembourg, Queen of Hungary (1319), wife of Charles I of Hungary
Marie of Luxembourg (1324), Queen consort of France and Navarre, second wife of King Charles IV of France
Isabelle of Valois (1373), wife of Gian Galeazzo Visconti, Lord of Milan 
Joanna of Bourbon (1378), Queen of France
Isabella of Valois (1409), Queen consort of England as the second spouse of King Richard II. Her parents were King Charles VI of France and Isabeau of Bavaria.
Beatrice of Navarre, Countess of La Marche (1412), first wife of James II, Count of La Marche
Catherine of Valois (1437), Queen consort of England from 1420 to 1422.
Marie de Bourbon, Duchess of Calabria (1448)
Agnès Sorel (1450), first Chief Mistress Of Charles VII of France
Anne of Savoy (1480), first wife of Frederick of Naples
Madeleine de La Tour d'Auvergne (1519)
Claude of France (1524), Queen of France as the first wife of Francis I
Eleonore of Fürstenberg (1544), wife of Philipp IV, Count of Hanau-Lichtenberg
Elisabeth of Valois (1568), Queen of Spain
Marguerite de Berbisey (1573), mother of Jane Frances de Chantal
Marie of Cleves, Princess of Condé (1574)
Claude of Valois (1575), Duchess of Lorraine
Charlotte de La Marck (1594), Princess of Sedan and Duchess of Bouillon
Jeanne Brochard (1597), mother of René Descartes, died after giving birth to a stillborn child
Gabrielle d'Estrées (1599), mistress of the French King, died following eclampsia
Marie de Bourbon, Duchess of Montpensier (1627), Duchess of Orléans
Jeanne Sconin Racine (1641), mother of Jean Racine, died while giving birth to her second child, Marie
Elisabeth of France (1644), first wife and Queen consort of Philip IV of Spain
Claude Françoise de Lorraine (1648), wife of Nicholas II, Duke of Lorraine, died while giving birth to twin daughters
Marie Angélique de Scorailles (1681), noble
 Catherine Françoise, Comtesse de Croÿ-Roeulx (1686), first wife of Walrad, Prince of Nassau-Usingen
Armande de La Tour d'Auvergne (1717), noble
Marie Louise Élisabeth d'Orléans (1719), Duchess of Berry a.k.a. "Joufflotte", married at 14, widow at 18, died at 23 soon after her sixth delivery, pregnant again at autopsy.
Margravine Auguste Marie Johanna of Baden-Baden, duchesse d'Orléans, (1726) and paternal great-grandmother of Louis-Philippe I, King of the French
Louise Diane d'Orléans (1736), princesse de Conti, youngest daughter of [[Philippe II, Duke of Orléans|Philippe d'Orléans, Regent of France']]
Anne Marie Louise de La Tour d'Auvergne (1739), noble
Pauline Félicité de Mailly (1741), marquise de Vintimille and second of the five famous de Nesle sisters
Princess Anne Therese of Savoy (1745), daughter of the Prince and Princess of Carignan, wife of Charles de Rohan;
Infanta Maria Teresa Rafaela of Spain, Dauphine of France (1746), first wife of Louis, Dauphin of France (1729–1765) and daughter in law of Louis XV of France
Antoinette-Eustachie née Crozat du Châtel (1747), mother of Armand Louis de Gontaut
Émilie du Châtelet (1749), mathematician, physicist, and author
Charlotte Rosalie de Choiseul-Beaupré (1753), lady-in-waiting
Princess Maria Teresa Felicitas of Modena, duchesse de Penthièvre (1754) and maternal grandmother of Louis-Philippe I
Jacqueline Marguerite Carrault (1764), mother of Maximilien Robespierre
Catherine Éléonore Bénard (1769), mistress of Louis XV of France
Cecil Claye (1770), wife of André Michaux and mother of François André Michaux
Agathe Louise de Saint-Antoine de Saint-André (1774), illegitimate daughter of Louis XV of France. Her mother was Louis XV's Petite maîtresse, Marie-Louise O'Murphy.
Antoinette Gabrielle Charpentier (1793), first wife of George Danton
the mother of Edmond Albius (1829)
Juliette Dubufe (1855), sculptor
Princess Victoria of Saxe-Coburg and Gotha (1857), last Duchess of Nemours
Clotilde Pétain (née Legrand) (1857), mother of Philippe Pétain
Lucie Zoé Marie Jamin (1878), first wife of Henri Becquerel and mother of Jean Becquerel
Angélique Marie Augustine Lebesgue (1881), mother of two illegitimate children with Pierre, Duke of Penthièvre
Marie-Félix Blanc (1882)
Eva Gonzalès (1883), Impressionist painter
 Margarita Herrero (1937), first wife of George Steer
Élisabeth Casteret (1940), wife of Norbert Casteret

 Georgia 
 Balendukht
 Tamar of Mukhrani (1683)
 Ketevan Andronikashvili (1782)
 Princess Elene of Georgia (1786)
 Daria Gruzinskaya (1796)

Germany
Gertrude of Süpplingenburg (1143), Margravine
Elisabeth of Swabia (1235), Queen consort of Castile 
Anna von Schweidnitz (1362), third wife of Charles IV, Holy Roman Emperor
Elisabeth of Bavaria-Landshut (1451), second wife of Ulrich V, Count of Württemberg
 Barbara Löffelholz (1488), mother of Caritas Pirckheimer
Hedwig von Flersheim (1516), only wife of Franz von Sickingen
Magdalena of Saxony (1534), Maragravine
Dorothea von Regenstein (1545)
Agnes of Hesse (1555), princess
Juliane of Wied (1575), first wife of Reichard, Count Palatine of Simmern-Sponheim
Magdalene of Lippe (1587), landgravine
Dorothea of Saxony (1587), princess 
Sophie of Württemberg, Duchess of Saxe-Weimar (1590), noblewoman
Elisabeth of Mansfeld-Hinterort (1596)
Agnes of Solms-Laubach (1602), Landgravine
Sibylle Elisabeth of Württemberg (1606), princess 
Dorothea Hedwig of Brunswick-Wolfenbüttel (1609), princess
Duchess Sophie of Prussia (1610), only wife of Wilhelm Kettler
Johanna Elisabeth of Nassau-Hadamar (1647), princess
Sophia Eleonore of Hesse-Darmstadt (1663), Landgravine
Maria Elisabeth of Holstein-Gottorp (1665), landgravine
Sibylle Ursula von Braunschweig-Lüneburg (1671), translator and writer
Dorothea Maria of Saxe-Weimar, Duchess of Saxe-Zeitz (1675)
Marie Luise von Degenfeld (1677)
Christiane of Saxe-Merseburg (1679)
Sophie Hedwig of Saxe-Merseburg (1686)
Eleonore Sophie of Saxe-Weimar (1687)
Sophie Tugendreich von Wreech (1688), first wife of Dubislav Gneomar von Natzmer
Catharina Margaretha Miculcin (1696), first wife of Georg Ernst Stahl
Princess Luise Dorothea of Prussia (1705), Hereditary Princess of Hesse-Kassel
Barbara Eleonora Tentzel (1706), second wife of Georg Ernst Stahl
Princess Elisabeth Albertine of Anhalt-Dessau (1706), noblewoman
Christine Juliane of Baden-Durlach (1707), noblewoman
Maria Clara Eimmart (1707)
Countess Palatine Elisabeth Auguste Sofie of Neuburg (1728), Hereditary Princess of Sulzbach
Louise of Anhalt-Dessau (1732), first wife of Victor Frederick, Prince of Anhalt-Bernburg
Catharina Sperling-Heckel (1741), German artist
Charlotte Eberhardine Hofmann (1742), second and final wife of Adam Falckenhagen
Anna Rebecca Riese (1743), first wife of Johann Christian Senckenberg
Katharina Rebecca von Mettingh (1747), second wife of Johann Christian Senckenberg
Christiane Sophie Charlotte of Brandenburg-Bayreuth (1757), Duchess of Saxe-Hildburghausen 
Josepha von Heydeck (1771)
Princess Friederike of Hesse-Darmstadt (1782), Duchess of Mecklenburg-Strelitz
Princess Charlotte of Hesse-Darmstadt (1785), by marriage Duchess of Mecklenburg-Strelitz.
Duchess Frederica of Württemberg (1785), daughter of Frederick II Eugene, Duke of Württemberg and Friederike Dorothea of Brandenburg-Schwedt.
Luise Mejer (1786), first wife of Heinrich Christian Boie
Duchess Augusta of Brunswick-Wolfenbüttel (1788)
Duchess Louise Charlotte of Mecklenburg-Schwerin (1801), maternal grandmother of Prince Albert, husband of Queen Victoria of the UK.
Sophie Mereau (1806), writer
Marie of Brunswick-Wolfenbüttel (1808), mother of Charles II, Duke of Brunswick, and William, Duke of Brunswick
 Johanna Osthoff (1809) first wife of the mathematician Carl Friedrich Gauss
Princess Caroline Louise of Saxe-Weimar-Eisenach (1816)
 Dorothea Henriette Wilhelmine Friederike von Stülpnagel (1816)
Princess Adelheid of Anhalt-Bernburg-Schaumburg-Hoym (1820), first wife of Augustus, Grand Duke of Oldenburg
Friederike Luise Charlotte von Mengershausen (1821), only wife of Friedrich August von Klinkowström
Princess Mathilde of Waldeck and Pyrmont (1825)
Henriette Spitzeder (1828), opera singer
Sophia Reuss (1835), first wife of Karl Gottlieb Pfander (she died in Armenia)
Agnes Burtz (1838), first wife of Max Stirner.
Friederike Fliedner (1842), only wife of Theodor Fliedner
Princess Cecilia of Sweden (1844), daughter of King Gustav IV Adolf of Sweden and Frederica of Baden, a composer
Mathilde Voigt (1847), first wife of Wilhelm von Planck and Mother of Hugo Planck
Charlotte of Saxe-Meiningen (1855), first wife of Georg II, Duke of Saxe-Meiningen and mother of Bernhard III, Duke of Saxe-Meiningen
Princess Anna of Saxony (1859), first wife of Ferdinand IV, Grand Duke of Tuscany
Adelheid of Ysenburg-Büdingen (1861), princess and first wife of Charles, Prince of Löwenstein-Wertheim-Rosenberg
Princess Anna of Hesse and by Rhine (1865), Grand Duchess of Mecklenburg-Schwerin
Paula Haber (1868), mother of Fritz Haber
Henriette Thurneysen (1872), first wife of Eugen Langen
Anna Weber (1873), mother of Marianne Weber
Princess Elisabeth of Thurn and Taxis (1881)
Princess Marie of Waldeck and Pyrmont (1882), Princess of Württemberg
Princess Marie of Prussia (1888)
Selma Hedwig Dorothea Koenen (1890), the mother of Max Clarenbach
the mother of Josefa Berens-Totenohl (1891)
Anna Riesch (1894),  first wife of Julius Richard Petri
the mother of Max Koegel (1901)
Paula Modersohn-Becker (1907), artist
the mother of Erich Mielke (1911)
Grete Planck (1917), daughter of Max Planck, twin of Emma Planck who also died in childbirth
Princess Viktoria Feodora of Reuss-Schleiz (1918), daughter of Heinrich XXVII, Prince Reuss Younger Line, first wife of Duke Adolf Friedrich of Mecklenburg, died after giving birth to Duchess Woizlawa Feodora of Mecklenburg
Emma Planck (1919), daughter of Max Planck, twin of Grete Planck who also died in childbirth
Marie Prox (1923), first wife of Kurt Nehrling 
Princess Stephanie of Schaumburg-Lippe (1925), daughter of Prince Frederick of Schaumburg-Lippe and Princess Louise of Denmark
Princess Barbara Maria Antonietta Luitpolda of Bourbon-Two Sicilies (1927), daughter of Princess Maria Ludwiga Theresia of Bavaria
Marie Gentil (1928), sister of Otto Gentil
Margarethe  Jaross (1940), the mother of Christoph Eschenbach 
Irmgard Poppen (1963), first wife of Dietrich Fischer-Dieskau

Greece
Antigone of Epirus (295 BC)
 Nysa (wife of Pharnaces I of Pontus) (160 BC)
 Athenais (daughter of Herodes Atticus) (161)
 Agnes of Montferrat (1208), first Empress consort of Henry of Flanders
Theodora Tocco (1429), first wife of Constantine Palaiologos
 Maria Katelouzou Venizelou (1894), wife of Eleftherios Venizelos, giving birth to Sophoklis Venizelos

Hungary
Clemence of Austria (1293 or 1295)
Beatrice of Luxembourg (1319)
Mary, Queen of Hungary (1395)
Zsófia Forgách (1590), first wife of György Thurzó
Krisztina Nyáry (1641)
Ilona Grosz (1909), mother of Miklós Radnóti

India
Maya, mother of Gautama Buddha
Masuma Sultan Begum (1509)
Mumtaz Mahal (1631), wife of Mughal emperor Shah Jahan. Her memorial is the Taj Mahal
Dayawati Bai (1683), a Kachhawa princess of Amber and wife of Jai Singh of Mewar
Gowri Lakshmi Bayi (1815), Maharani of Travancore
Sahib Kaur (1841)
Maharani Lakshmi Bayi of Travancore (1857), mother of Moolam Thirunal Rama Varma, Maharajah of Travancore
HH Pooradam Thirunal Lakshmi Bayi (1857), mother of Bharani Thirunal Lakshmi Bayi
the first wife of Motilal Nehru 
Raju Hirachand (1882), the mother of Walchand Hirachand
Radhabai Karve (1891), first wife of Dhondo Keshav Karve and mother of Raghunath Dhondo Karve
Jiu Kilachand, first wife of Walchand Hirachand
The mother of Jeevan (1915)
T. K. Padmini (1969), painter
Smita Patil (1986), Indian actress and wife of Raj Babbar

Indonesia
Raden Ajeng Kartini (1904), Promoter of gender equality in Indonesia
Percha Leanpuri (2021), politician

Ireland
Mary Letitia Martin (1850), novelist
Brigid (née Hegarty) Browne (1880), mother of Francis Browne
the mother of James Cross (1921)
Sheila Hodgers (1983, also died of Multiple Cancers)
Ann Lovett (1984), unmarried teenage mother whose death sparked a national debate
Savita Halappanavar (2012), her death caused widespread outrage after doctors refused to terminate her 17-week-long pregnancy, and ignited protests and debate on Irish abortion laws.

Israel
Maria of Montferrat (1212), Queen of Jerusalem, died after giving birth to Isabella, also died in childbirth.
Isabella II of Jerusalem (1228), Holy Roman Empress, daughter of Maria of Montferrat, who died in childbirth.

Italy

Julia (104 BC), first wife of Sulla
Caecilia Metella (89 BC), second daughter of Quintus Caecilius Metellus Balearicus
 Aemilia Scaura (82 BC), daughter of the Roman patrician Marcus Aemilius Scaurus
Cornelia (69 BC), wife of Julius Caesar, mother of Julia, who also died in childbirth
Julia (54 BC), daughter of Julius Caesar and fourth wife of Pompey
Tullia (45 BC), daughter of Marcus Tullius Cicero
Junia Claudilla (34 AD, 36 AD, or 37 AD), first wife of Caligula, Roman Emperor
Poppaea Sabina (65 AD), second wife of Nero
Julia Flavia (91 AD), daughter of emperor Titus
Galla (394), wife of Theodosius I
Joan of England, Queen of Sicily (1199), fourth wife of Raymond VI, Count of Toulouse
Yolande Palaiologina (1342), daughter of Theodore I, Marquess of Montferrat 
Bonaventura di Benincasa (1363), Elder sister of Catherine of Siena
Maria of Calabria (1366)
Bandecca (1390), first wife of Gregorio Dati
Isabetta (Betta) Villanuzzi (1402), second wife of Gregorio Dati
Ginevra (1419), third wife of Gregorio Dati
Costanza Varano (1447)
 Lisa di Giovanni Filippo de' Carducci (1465), first wife of Antonmaria di Noldo Gherardini
 Caterina di Mariotto Rucellai (1473), second wife of Antonmaria di Noldo Gherardini
Anne of Savoy (1480), Queen of Naples
Beatrice d'Este (1497), wife of Lodovico Sforza
Anna Sforza (1497), Hereditary Princess of Ferrara
Lucrezia Borgia (1519), daughter of Pope Alexander VI
Clarice de' Medici (1528)
Ippolita Gonzaga (1563), daughter of Ferrante Gonzaga
Marietta Robusti (1590), 16th-century artist and daughter of the artist Jacopo Tintoretto
Catherine Michaela of Spain (1597), daughter of Philip II of Spain and Elisabeth of Valois
 Prudenzia di Ottaviano Montoni (1606), wife of Orazio Gentileschi and mother of Artemisia Gentileschi
Isabella of Savoy (1626), daughter of Charles Emmanuel I, Duke of Savoy
Maria Caterina Farnese (1646), first wife of Francesco I d'Este, Duke of Modena
Vittoria Farnese (1649), daughter of Ranuccio I Farnese, niece of Pope Clement VIII
Laura Mancini (1657), eldest of the five famous Mancini sisters
Princess Margaret Yolande of Savoy (1663), Duchess of Parma
Isabella d'Este, (1666) second wife of Ranuccio II Farnese, Duke of Parma
Princess Charlotte Felicity of Brunswick (1710), died in Modena, wife of Rinaldo d'Este, Duke of Modena
Anne Christine of Sulzbach (1723), first wife of Charles Emmanuel III of Sardinia
Caterina Silvestri Agate (1735), wife of Corrado Giaquinto
Elisabeth Therese of Lorraine (1741), final wife of Charles Emmanuel III of Sardinia
Princess Luisa of Naples and Sicily (1802), died in Vienna; wife of Ferdinand III, Grand Duke of Tuscany
Maria Theresa of Naples and Sicily (1807), eldest daughter of Ferdinand IV of Naples
Maria Brizzi Giorgi (1812), organist
Maria Cristina of Savoy (1836), first Queen consort of Ferdinand II of the Two Sicilies
Charlotte Napoléone Bonaparte (1839), daughter of Joseph Bonaparte, older brother of Emperor Napoleon I
Clotilde Staderini (1849), mother of Raffaello Giovagnoli
Lella Ricci (1871), opera singer
Carlotta Marchisio (1872), opera singer 
Princess Maria Pia of Bourbon-Two Sicilies (1882)
 Olga Liberati (1927), died after giving birth to twin girls, Lorenza Mazzetti and Paola Mazzetti
 Maria Antonietta Pasquini dei Conti di Costafiorita (1944), second wife of Irakli Bagration of Mukhrani and mother of Jorge Bagration of Mukhrani
 Maria Inzitari (1944), only wife of Oscar Luigi Scalfaro, President of Italy from 1992 to 1999.
Gianna Beretta Molla (1962), pediatrician who was canonized by Pope John Paul II in 2004
Nelly Fioramonti (1973), pop singer and first wife of Tony Cucchiara

Japan
Imperial Princess Ishi (899 AD), consort of Emperor Daigo
Princess Hiroko (950 AD), first consort of Emperor Suzaku
Fujiwara no Anshi (964 AD), wife of Emperor Murakami
Fujiwara no Teishi (1001), wife of Emperor Ichijō
Koshikibu no Naishi (1025), poet
Fujiwara no Yoshiko (1025), consort of Emperor Go-Suzaku
Fujiwara no Ishi (1033), wife of Emperor Horikawa and mother of Emperor Toba
Fujiwara no Genshi (1039), wife of Emperor Go-Suzaku
 Fujiwara no Ishi (1103), wife of Emperor Horikawa
 Minamoto no Ishi (1148), mother of Emperor Nijō
Fujiwara no Shunshi (1233), wife of Emperor Go-Horikawa and mother of Emperor Shijō
Kitsuno (1566), concubine.
Tamahime (1622), daughter of Tokugawa Hidetaka and Oeyo; wife of Maeda Toshitsune
Oshima no Kata (1660), concubine of Shogun Tokugawa Ietsuna
Ofuri no Kata (1667), concubine of Shogun Tokugawa Ietsuna
Yoshino no Kata (1680), concubine of ShogunTokugawa Ietsuna
Yasuko no Kata (1681), concubine of Shogun Tokugawa Tsunayoshi and daughter of Makino Narisada
Fushimi-no-Miya Masako (1710), wife of Emperor Nakamikado
Itsuki no Miya (1710), consort of shogun Tokugawa Ienobu (her baby died in utero)
Konoe Hisako (1720), consort of Emperor Nakamikado and mother of Emperor Sakuramachi
Nami-no-Miya Masuko (1733), wife of shogun Tokugawa Ieshige
Kuze Natsuko (1734), consort of Emperor Nakamikado
Shimizutani Iwako (1735), consort of Emperor Nakamikado
Oume no Kata (1794), consort of shogun Tokugawa Ienari 
Higashiboujo Kazuko (1811), consort of Emperor Kōkaku
Takatsukasa Tsunako (1823), wife of Emperor Ninkō
Bojo Nobuko (1850), consort of Emperor Kōmei
Osada Hartmann (1867), mother of Sadakichi Hartmann
Hamuro Mitsuko (1873), consort of Emperor Meiji
Hashimoto Natsuko (1873), consort of Emperor Meiji
the mother of Inejirō Asanuma (1898)
Princess Kujo Noriko (1901), daughter of Kujō Michitaka and first wife of Prince Yamashina Kikumaro
Princess Kaya Sakiko, daughter of Prince Kaya Kuninori and only wife of Takehiko Yamashina (she was pregnant during the 1923 Great Kantō earthquake which killed her and her unborn baby boy.)
Madokoro Akutagawa Saori (1966), Japanese painter

 Kazakhstan 
Amansha Berentayeva (1925), second wife of Ilyas Zhansugurov

Korea
Queen Jeongsun (1237), Consort of Wonjong of Goryeo and mother of Chungnyeol of Goryeo
Queen Noguk (1365), Mongolian born Consort of Gongmin of Goryeo
Queen Hyeondeok (1441), Consort of Munjong of Joseon and Mother of Danjong of Joseon
Queen Jangsun (1461), Consort of Yejong of Joseon
Queen Janggyeong (1515), Consort of Jungjong of Joseon and mother of Injong of Joseon
Royal Consort Suk-won of the Lee clan (1520), Consort of Jungjong of Joseon
Royal Consort Suk-ui of the Gyeongju Lee clan (1524), Consort of Jungjong of Joseon
Princess Hyohye (1531), daughter of Jungjong of Joseon and Queen Janggyeong
Princess Hyojeong (1544), daughter of Jungjong of Joseon
Princess Hyosun (1544), daughter of Jungjong of Joseon
Queen Inyeol (1636), Consort of Injo of Joseon
Princess Hwapyeong (1748), daughter of Yeongjo of Joseon
the mother of Stephen Min Kuk-ka (1787)
Kim Jong-suk (1949), second wife of Kim Il Sung and mother of Kim Jong Il and grandmother to Kim Jong Un

Liberia
Salome Karwah (2017), Ebola survivor

Madagascar
Princess Razafinandriamanitra of Madagascar (1897)

Mexico
Cihuateteo (Aztec Era)
Julia Pastrana (1860), born with hypertrichosis, took part in exhibition tours in North America and Europe because of her unusual appearance
Delfina Ortega Díaz (1880), First Lady Of Mexico 
Cristina Farfán (1880),  educator, writer, and women's rights activist
María de los Dolores Eleuteria Clotilde Cardeña Espino (1897), first wife of Guillermo Kahlo
Hiromi Hayakawa (2017), singer and actress

Montenegro
 Princess Zorka of Montenegro (1890), mother of King Alexander I of Yugoslavia

The Netherlands
 Aleijda Verwers (1665), mother of Aleijda Wolfsen, who also died in childbirth
 Aleijda Wolfsen (1692), painter 
 Anna Maria de Bruyn (1744), ballet dancer and stage actor
 Suzanna Sablairolles (1867), stage actor
 C.C. van Asch van Wijck (1932), sculptor 
 Ruth Judith Klee (1942), daughter of Alfred Klee and mother of Hanneli Goslar

Nepal
Trailokya Rajya Lakshmi Devi (1850), queen consort
 the mother of Bir Shumsher Jung Bahadur Rana (1852)
Indra Rajya Lakshmi Devi Shah (1950), crown princess

Nigeria
 Bisi Komolafe (2012), actress
 Funmilola Ogundana (2013), sprinter
 Moji Olaiya (2017), actress
Diekolola Osa Avielele (2020), daughter of Cornelius Adebayo and businesswoman
 Sadiya Magatakarda Wamakko (2020), daughter of Aliyu Magatakarda Wamakko

Norway
Alfhild (1024), English Concubine of Olaf II of Norway and mother of Magnus the Good
 Christina of Norway (1213), Princess of Norway
 Margaret of Scotland (Queen of Norway) (1283), after giving birth to Margaret, Maid of Norway
Martha Elisabeth Jensdatter Wissing (1734), wife of Frederik Nannestad
the first wife of Johann Georg Hiedler (1824)
Marie Lovise Falkenberg (1841), first wife of Oluf Steen Julius Berner and mother of Carl Berner
Jeanette Sofie Augusta Dahl (1884), wife of Hjalmar Heiberg and mother of Jean Heiberg
Kristine Henden (1905), first wife of Anders A. Lothe
the first wife of Vidar Theisen (1962)

Ottoman Empire
 Ismihan Sultan (1585), princess
 Fatma Sultan (1590), princess 
 Kaya Sultan (1659), princess
 Mihrimah Sultan (1838), princess
Nergizev Hanım (1848)
 Nesrin Kadın (1876), imperial consort
Melek Hanem (1884), first wife of Xhemal Pasha Zogu
 Esma Sultan (1899), princess
Winifred Brun (1909), first wife of Ali Kemal

Papua New Guinea
 Princess Singdo (1921), born in Tabar Island in New Ireland Province in then German New Guinea, wife of Carl Emil Pettersson

Persia
Stateira I (332 BCE), Queen of Persia and wife of Darius III, died in captivity.
Balendukht (5th century)
Dilras Banu Begum (1657), chief consort of Aurangzeb

Peru
Lady of Cao

 The Philippines 
 Olympia Rizal Mercado (1887), sister of José Rizal
Leonor Rivera–Kipping (1893)

Poland
Anna von Schweidnitz (1362), Queen of Bohemia 
Jadwiga of Poland (1399), monarch of Poland
Elizabeth Jagiellon (1517), daughter of Casimir IV Jagiellon and Elizabeth of Austria first wife of Frederick II of Legnica
Anne of Austria, Queen of Poland (1598), Austrian born Queen of Poland
Elisabeth Kettler of Courland (1601), daughter of Gotthard Kettler, wife of Adam Wenceslaus, Duke of Cieszyn and mother of Frederick William, Duke of Cieszyn
Marianna Wiśniowiecka (1624), noble
Cecilia Renata of Austria (1644), Queen of Poland
Ludwika Karolina Radziwiłł (1695)
Zofia Servais (1872), mother of Misia Sert
Princess Malgorzata Izabella Czartoryska (1929), first wife of Prince Gabriel of Bourbon-Two Sicilies
 The mother of Anna Anka (1971)

Portugal
Berengaria of Portugal (1221), Queen consort of Denmark
Constanza Manuel (1345), wife of Peter I of Portugal
Isabella of Asturias (1498), married Afonso of Portugal and Manuel I of Portugal
Maria of Aragon, Queen of Portugal (1517)
Beatrice of Portugal, Duchess of Savoy (1538)
Isabella of Portugal (1539), Holy Roman Empress, Queen of Italy and Queen of Spain
Maria Manuela of Portugal (1545), daughter of King John III of Portugal and his wife Catherine of Austria
Infanta Mariana Victoria of Portugal (1788, also died of Smallpox), wife of Infante Gabriel of Spain, who died of Smallpox
Maria Isabel of Portugal (1818), Queen of Spain as the second wife of Ferdinand VII of Spain
Queen Maria II of Portugal (1853)

Raj of Sarawak
 Juliana (Julia) Caroline Welstead (1862), second wife of John Brooke Johnson Brooke

Romania
the mother of Irina Ionesco (1930; died in France)
Dina Papană (1938), first wife of Alexandru Papană

Russia
Maria Miloslavskaya (1669), first wife of Alexis of Russia
Agafya Grushetskaya (1681), first wife of Tsar Feodor III of Russia
Charlotte Christine of Brunswick-Lüneburg (1715), consort of Tsarevich Alexei Petrovich of Russia
Grand Duchess Anna Petrovna of Russia (1728), daughter of Catherine I of Russia and mother of Peter III of Russia
Grand Duchess Anna Leopoldovna of Russia (1746), regent of Russia and mother of Ivan VI of Russia
Grand Duchess Natalia Alexeievna of Russia (1776), first daughter in law of Catherine II of Russia the child was stillborn
 Anna Vasilyevna Radishcheva (née Rubanovskaya) (1783), first wife of Alexander Radishchev
Grand Duchess Alexandra Pavlovna of Russia (1801), daughter of Tsar Paul I of Russia and archduchess of Austria as consort of Archduke Joseph, Palatine of Hungary
Elizaveta Ivanovna Karamzina (née Protasova) (1802), first wife of Nikolay Karamzin
Anna Rezanova (née Shelikhova) (1802), daughter of Natalia Shelikhova and wife of Nikolai Rezanov
Praskovia Kovalyova-Zhemchugova (1803), opera singer and actress
 Countess Ekaterina Dmitrievna Pashkova (née Zubova) (1821), first wife of Andrei Ivanovich Pashkov
Maria Andreevna Moyer (née Protasova) (1823), half niece of Vasily Zhukovsky
Sofya Petrovna Lobanova-Rostovskaya (née Lopukhina) (1825), daughter of Pyotr Lopukhin
 Ekaterina Gontcharova (1843), older sister of Natalia Pushkina and wife of Georges-Charles de Heeckeren d'Anthès
Grand Duchess Alexandra Nikolaevna of Russia (1844), youngest daughter of Tsar Nicholas I, Emperor of Russia, and his wife, Princess Charlotte of Prussia
Grand Duchess Elizabeth Mikhailovna of Russia (1845), daughter of Grand Duke Mikhail Pavlovich of Russia and Princess Charlotte of Württemberg
 Anna Nikolaevna Gagarina (née Dolgorukova) (1845), first wife of Grigory Gagarin
Ekaterina Dmitrievna Pirogova (née Berezina) (1846), first wife of Nikolay Pirogov
Nastasya Vasilyevna Makarova (1848), mother of Ivan Yakovlev
 Natalia Alexandrovna Herzen (née Zakharyina) (1852), wife of Alexander Herzen
Anna Dmitrievna Dashkova (1858), second wife of Adam Rzhevusky and mother of Catherine Radziwill
Mariya Meshcherskaya (1868), a lady-in-waiting
Daria Konstantinowa Opotschinina (1870), granddaughter of Mikhail Kutuzov and countess of Beauharnais
Evgeniya Evreinova (1872), niece of Vasily Khitrovo, first wife of Pavel Diaghilev and mother of Sergei Diaghilev
Countess Varvara Petrovna Shuvalova (1872), first wife of David Orlov
Hesya Helfman (1882), member of Narodnaya Volya
Alexandra Georgievna of Greece and Denmark, (1891) consort of Grand Duke Paul Alexandrovich of Russia
Maria Abramova (1892), second wife of Dmitry Mamin-Sibiryak
Ekaterina Beketova (1892), Russian poet and writer
the mother of Olga Zhizneva (1899)
Alexandra Veligorskaia (1906), first wife of Leonid Andreyev and mother of Daniil Andreyev
Valentina Nikolaevna Mokievskaya-Zubok (1928), mother of Victor Louis
Natalia Rykova (1928), wife of Grigory Gukovsky
Elena Chaika (1954), mother of singer Lyubov Uspenskaya
Vasilya Fattakhova (2016), singer

Serbia
Milica Branković (1464), first wife of Leonardo III Tocco, Mother of Carlo III Tocco
Ruža Anastasijević (1803), mother of Miša Anastasijević
Bobana Veličković (2020), sport shooter

Singapore
Wong Ming Yang (1982), first wife of prime minister Lee Hsien Loong

Slovenia
Josipina Turnograjska (1854), poet

South Africa
Aletta Beyers (1895), wife of Eugène Marais
Bongi Makeba (1985), singer

Spain
Urraca of León (1126), Queen of León, Castile, and Galicia 
Elvira of Castile, Queen of Sicily (1135)
Blanche of Navarre (1156), wife of the future King Sancho III of Castile
Zaida of Seville (c.1171), a mistress and perhaps queen of Alfonso VI of Castile
Teresa Fernández de Traba (1180), queen consort of León
the mother of Raymond Nonnatus (1204)
Blanche of Anjou (1310), Queen of Aragon
Teresa d'Entença (1327), Queen consort of Aragon by her marriage to King Alfonso IV of Aragon
Maria of Navarre (1347)
Constance of Aragon, Queen of Sicily (1363)
Eleanor of Aragon, Queen of Castile (1382), Queen consort of Castile and León
Elvira Fernández de Córdoba y Manrique (1524), Noblewoman
Elisabeth of Valois (1568), third wife of Philip II of Spain
Isabel de Alderete y Urbina (1594), first wife of Lope de Vega
Infanta Catherine Michelle of Spain (1597), Duchess of Savoy
Margarita Teresa of Spain (1673)
Antonia Ramon, first wife of José de Urrutia
the mother of José Cadalso (1741)
Maria Teresa Rafaela of Spain (1746), first wife of Louis Ferdinand, Dauphin of France
 María Josefa de Madrid (1750), only wife of Matías de Gálvez y Gallardo
Princess Isabella of Parma (1763), Archduchess of Austria
Infanta María Amalia of Spain (1798) 
Maria Isabel of Braganza (1818), wife of Ferdinand VII of Spain 
Catalina Moll Mercades (1889), mother of Joan Riudavets Moll, Spanish supercentenarian
Mercedes, Princess of Asturias (1904)
Infanta María Teresa of Spain (1912)
The mother of Juan Marsé (1933)
Conchita Supervía (1936), opera singer

 Sweden 
Benedicta Ebbesdotter of Hvide (1200), queen consort of King Sverker II of Sweden.
 Ingeborg Eriksdotter of Sweden (1254), princess and the mother of the king
 Sofia Gyllenhielm (1583), noble and only wife of Pontus De la Gardie
 Christiana Oxenstierna (1701), noble
 Hedvig Taube (1744), royal mistress, salonist
 Carin du Rietz (1788), adventurer
 Anna Charlotta Schröderhiem (1791), salonist and socialite
 Charlotte Slottsberg (1800), ballerina 
 Cecilia Holstein-Gottorp (1844), Grand Duchess of Oldenburg
 Lady Augusta Margaret FitzClarence (1846), daughter of George FitzClarence, 1st Earl of Munster British-born wife of Baron Knut Philip Bonde, and mother of Ingeborg Augusta Sofia Bonde
 Marie-Louise af Forsell (1852), diarist
 Emilie Hammarskjöld (1854), composer, musician, member of the Royal Swedish academy of Music
 Emilia Uggla (1855), pianist
 Alma Svensson (1903), mother of Elsa Andersson
Leonie Witt (1910), daughter of Otto Nikolaus Witt and wife of Albert Johan Petersson

 Switzerland
Joanna of Pfirt (1351), duchess of Austria 
Suzanne Bernard Rousseau (1712), mother of Jean-Jacques Rousseau
 the mother of Charles Wyrsch (1920)

 Syria 
 Esther Teira (1943), first wife of Jacob Safra

 Thailand 
Somanass Waddhanawathy (1852)
Nueang Snidvongs (1885), Royal consort of Chulalongkorn

Tunisia
 Majida Boulila (1952)

United Kingdom
Beatrix de Vesci (1125)
Tangwystl (1196), mother of Gruffydd ap Llywelyn Fawr
Isabel Marshal (1240), English countess; great-grandmother of Robert the Bruce of Scotland
Isabella of England (1241), English princess and, by marriage, Holy Roman Empress, German Queen, and Queen consort of Sicily
Eleanor de Braose (1251), Cambro-Norman noblewoman
Beatrice of England (1275), Countess of Richmond
Eleanor de Montfort (1282), Princess of Wales and Lady of Snowdon
Isabella of Mar (1296), first wife of Robert I of Scotland, after delivering Marjorie Bruce, who also died in childbirth
Joan of Acre (1307), Countess of Hertford and Gloucester
Marjorie Bruce (1316), after delivering the future Robert II of Scotland
Elizabeth of Rhuddlan (1316), daughter of King Edward I and Eleanor of Castile
Margaret Bruce, princess
Mary de Bohun (1394), first wife of Henry IV of England and mother of Henry V
Alianore Holland, Countess of March (1405), first wife of Edward Charleton, 5th Baron Cherleton
Anne de Mortimer (1411), Countess of Cambridge, died giving birth to Richard Plantagenet, 3rd Duke of York
Philippa of England (1430), Queen of Denmark, Sweden, and Norway
 Elizabeth Greyndour (1452), daughter of Joan Greyndour and second wife of John Tiptoft, 1st Earl of Worcester
Anne of York, Duchess of Exeter (1476)
Isabel Neville, Duchess of Clarence (1476)
Eleanor of Scotland (1480), first wife of Sigismund, Archduke of Austria
Elizabeth of York (1503), queen of Henry VII of England and mother of Henry VIII
Jane Seymour (1537), third wife of Henry VIII of England, after delivering Edward VI
Catherine Parr (1548), sixth wife of Henry VIII of England
Jane Browne, Viscountess Montague (1552), noblewoman
Susan Webbe (1555), daughter and heiress of Henry Webbe and first wife of George Peckham
Elizabeth Leyburne (1567), noblewoman, widow of Thomas Dacre, 4th Baron Dacre and third wife of Thomas Howard, 4th Duke of Norfolk
Elizabeth Cecil, 16th Baroness de Ros (1591), daughter and heir of Edward Manners, 3rd Earl of Rutland
Elizabeth Stuart, 2nd Countess of Moray (1591)
Nicola Moray (1612), daughter of Robert Moray and wife of Robert Douglas, 1st Viscount of Belhaven
Margaret Witt (1615), widow of Hadrian à Saravia and first wife of Robert Hill
Anne (Dudley) Sutton (1615), lady-in-waiting
Margaret Wheeler (1616), got impregnated by Thomas Quiney
Elizabeth Skinner (1620), stepmother of Richard Crashaw
Margaret Butler (1632), daughter of Thomas Butler, 2nd Baron Cahir and wife of Edmond Butler, 3rd/13th Baron Dunboyne.
Mary Digby (1648), daughter of John Digby, 1st Earl of Bristol and second wife of Arthur Chichester, 1st Earl of Donegall (1606–1674) to whom she bore six sons and one daughter. Died giving birth to a second daughter (stillborn). She was buried in Eggesford Church, Devon, where is situated her memorial effigy.
Mary Powell (1652), first wife of John Milton
Frances Woodward (1657), daughter of Hezekiah Woodward and second wife of John Oxenbridge
Katherine Woodcock (1658), second wife of John Milton
Elizabeth Egerton (1663), writer
Margaret Brooke, Lady Denham (1667), concubine of James II of England
Anne Hyde (1671), first wife of James II of England
Margaret Godolphin (1678), courtier 
Elizabeth Knepp (1681), actress
Elizabeth Braddock (1683), wife of John Blow
Essex Finch, Countess of Nottingham (1684), first wife of Daniel Finch, 2nd Earl of Nottingham
Anne Chamberlyne (1691), first known British female sailor
Mary Lawley (1694), daughter of Sir Francis Lawley, 2nd Baronet and second wife of John Verney, 1st Viscount Fermanagh
Sarah Crossley (1702), only daughter and heiress of John Crossley of Kershaw House, Halifax and first wife of Richard Richardson
Mercy Bromley (1705), the daughter and eventual sole heir of William Bromley, wife of John Bromley and mother of Henry Bromley, 1st Baron Montfort 
Lady Mary Butler (1713), second daughter of the 2nd Duke of Ormonde
Lady Elizabeth Harley (1713), youngest daughter of Robert Harley, 1st Earl of Oxford and Earl Mortimer and first wife of Peregrine Osborne, 3rd Duke of Leeds
Theodosia Bligh, 10th Baroness Clifton (1722), peer
Susanna Gumley (1722), daughter of John Gumley and mother of John Lockman (priest)
Mary Gordon (1723), daughter of Sir Alexander Gordon, Bart., of Earlston, widow of Edward Goldie of Craigmuie, and second wife of John M'Millan
Lady Anne Cochrane (1724), first wife of James Hamilton, 5th Duke of Hamilton and mother of James Hamilton, 6th Duke of Hamilton
Frances Wyndham (1728), daughter of Thomas Wyndham and sister and heiress of Sir Francis Wyndham, 4th Baronet, and wife of Henry Bromley, 1st Baron Montfort 
Jane Johnson (1732), first wife of Theophilus Cibber
Ann Donne (1737), the mother of William Cowper
Maria, Lady Walpole (1738), second wife of Prime Minister Robert Walpole
Rhoda Delaval (1757), aristocrat 
Elizabeth Lynes, wife of William Kent
the wife of Cuthbert Shaw (1768)
Anna Maria Elers (1773), mother of Maria Edgeworth
Hester Stanhope, Viscountess Mahon (1780)
Fanny Blood (1785), illustrator
 Lady Mary Turner, née Shuttleworth (1786), only wife of Sir Thomas Gascoigne, 8th Baronet and mother of Thomas Gascoigne Jr
Eliza Norman (1792), wife of Habakkuk Crabb
Mary Wollstonecraft (1797), author of A Vindication of the Rights of Woman, after delivering Mary Shelley
Hester Anne Children (1800), from delivering Anna Atkins an English botanist and photographer
Mary Hamilton, wife of William Allen (Quaker), after delivering Mary Allen who also died in childbirth
Agnes Creyke (1800), fifth daughter of Colonel Ralph Creyke and first wife of Abolitionist Francis Wrangham
Margaret Jameson of Alloa (1805), mother of William Robertson (urban missionary)
Ann Griffiths (née Thomas) (1805), Welsh poet and writer of Methodist Christian hymns
Julia Ann Grimani (1806), wife of Charles Mayne Young
the mother of Henry Alford (1810)
Princess Charlotte Augusta of Wales (1817), only legitimate child of the future King George IV of the United Kingdom. The obstetrician later committed suicide.
Esther Acklom (1818), only wife of John Spencer, 3rd Earl Spencer
Eliza Pattle (1820), first wife of Edward Gibbon Wakefield, mother of Jerningham Wakefield.
Mary Allen (1823), daughter of William Allen (Quaker) and Mary Hamilton who had died giving birth to her
Mary Hunt (1827), first wife of Lansdown Guilding
Ellen Turner of Pott Shrigley (1831), wealthy heiress who had previously been kidnapped by Edward Gibbon Wakefield and forced to marry him.
Marianna Conan Doyle (1832), wife of John Doyle, mother of James William Edmund Doyle, Richard Doyle, Henry Edward Doyle and Charles Altamont Doyle and grandmother of Arthur Conan Doyle
Sophia Sidney, Baroness De L'Isle and Dudley (1837), eldest daughter of William IV and his longtime mistress Dorothea Jordan.
Elizabeth Gould (1841), painter
Eliza Maria Gordon-Cumming (1842), aristocrat, horticulturalist, palaeontologist and scientific illustrator
Elizabeth Emma Soyer (1842), oil painter
Louisa Harris (1845), daughter adopted by Samuel Courtauld
Harriet Avarina Brunetta Herbert (1847), sister-in-law of Richard Penruddocke Long
Jessie Dalrymple Goddard (1848), the daughter of Ambrose Goddard, first wife of Henry Vivian, 1st Baron Swansea and Mother of Ernest Ambrose Vivian, p Come here 2nd Baron Swansea 
Lady Katherine Manners (1848), wife of Frederick Hervey, 2nd Marquess of Bristol (she also died of smallpox)
Angela Birch (1848), mother of Robert Hope Moncrieff
Anne Pearse (1849), first wife of Robert Napier, 1st Baron Napier of Magdala
Elizabeth Harrison (1850), mother of Jane Ellen Harrison
Elizabeth Ann Ashurst Bardonneau (1850), first translator of George Sand's work into English
Susan Perriman Harris (1851), first wife of John Crawford Woods
Caroline Sophia Wyndham (1852), daughter of George Wyndham, 1st Baron Leconfield
Harriet Ann Dickinson (1858), daughter of John Dickinson, first wife of John Evans and mother of Arthur Evans
Eleanor Bromley (1860), mother of Nelly Bromley
the mother of D’Arcy Wentworth Thompson (1860)
Joanna Mary Boyce (1861), painter
Harriet Kenrick (1863), mother of Austen Chamberlain, statesman and recipient of the Nobel Peace Prize
Mary Jane Jackson Hawkshaw (1863), daughter of Ann And John Hawkshaw and mother of Cecil Wedgwood
the biological mother of Janet Achurch (1864)
Isabella Beeton (1865), author of Mrs Beeton's Book of Household Management''
Evelina de Rothschild (1866), socialite
 Fanny Waugh Holman Hunt (1866), first wife of William Holman Hunt
Mary Shield Bell (1871), mother of Gertrude Bell, traveller and diplomat
Florence Kenrick (1875), mother of Neville Chamberlain, prime minister
Margaret Drinnen (1875), wife of Young Tom Morris, who died from apnea shortly thereafter.
Helen Meares (née Townsend) (1877), mother of Cecil Meares
Catherine Van Sommer (1881), mother of Harry Paddon
Clara Frances Lugsdin (1882), mother of George Mulock
Hannah Smith (1889), mother of Edward Wadsworth
Margaret Cowley (1892), second wife of John Jack Lennon (1855-1921; father of Alfred Lennon)
Charlotte Barrett (1896), first wife of Gustave Slapoffski
Bessie MacNicol (1904), painter
Hon. Margaret Baring (1906), wife of Charles Spencer, 6th Earl Spencer
Ida Nettleship (1907), artist
Alice Moorhead (1910), one of the first female physicians in Scotland
Ella Fourman (1910), mother of Ellic Howe
 Kate Skinner (1912), mother of Daisy and Violet Hilton
Laura Maud McCliver, mother of Michael Dillon (1915), an early female-to-male transsexual
Ellen Kate Allen (1916), mother of Mary Hignett
Louise Woodward (1919), first wife of Charles Joughin
Mary Theresa Danher (1919), mother of Mary McCartney.
the mother of Sybil Flory (1920, In Present Day Burma)
Gwyneth Bebb (1921), lawyer
Edith Maude Jenkins (1927), mother of Richard Burton 
Olivia Burges (1930)
Betty Jardine (1945), actress
Pauline Gower (1947), married name Pauline Fahie, a pilot who headed the female branch of the Air Transport Auxiliary during the Second World War. Died giving birth to twin sons
Cicely Rodger (1949), first wife of George Rodger
Franki Raffles (1994), photographer

United States
Mary Forth (1615), wife of John Winthrop
Thomasine Clopton (1616), wife of John Winthrop
Mary (Norris) Allerton (1621), Mayflower passenger
Anne Child (1689), first wife of Josiah Franklin
Eliza Marble (1719), wife of Edward Low
Mary Phillips (1737), daughter of Samuel Phillips, older sister of John Phillips and aunt of Samuel Phillips Jr.
Hester Hampton (1739), mother of Rebecca Boone
Martha Eppes Wayles (1748), mother-in-law of Thomas Jefferson
Elizabeth Taylor Carter (1760), great-grandmother of James P. T. Carter
 Amy Whipple Wilkinson (1764), mother of the Public Universal Friend
Jane Colden (1766), botanist and daughter of Cadwallader Colden
Maria Ygnacia Manuela Pinuelas (1775), wife of José Vicente Feliz
Esther Hawley Lyman (1775), mother of Lyman Beecher and grandmother of Harriet Beecher Stowe, Henry Ward Beecher, Charles Beecher, Edward Beecher, Isabella Beecher Hooker, Catharine Beecher, and Thomas K. Beecher.
Martha Jefferson (1782), wife of Thomas Jefferson
Phillis Wheatley (1784), first American black female poet
Elizabeth Andrews (1788), first wife of Benjamin Pierce (father of Franklin Pierce)
Mary Jefferson Eppes (1804), daughter of Thomas Jefferson
Hannah Slater (1812)
Elizabeth Oliver (1815), first wife of Benjamin Waterhouse
Adelphia Batson (1819), first wife of John Bond Jr.
Kalanipauahi (1826), Hawaiian queen consort/princess and a member of the House of Kamehameha
Sarah Lincoln Grigsby (1828), sister of president Abraham Lincoln
the mother of Lide Meriwether (1829)
Julia Clapp (1831), first wife of John Murdock and biological mother of Julia Murdock Smith
Julia Beckwith (née Neale) Jackson (1831), mother Of Stonewall Jackson
Dianthe Lusk (1832), first wife of John Brown
Nahienaena (1836), Hawaiian Princess
Rachel Plummer (1839), daughter of James W. Parker
 Waanibe (1841), first wife of Kit Carson
the mother of Charles Yerkes (1842)
Emily Hoyt Ballard (1844), first wife of Daniel Dole 
Olivia Loughridge (1845), first wife of Robert McGill Loughridge
Olive Grey Frost Young (1845), 16th Wife Of Brigham Young
Eliza Hoge (1846), mother of James Hoge Tyler
Lucinda Matilda (née Cook) Daniel (1849), mother of Jack Daniel
the second wife of Jim Bridger (1849)
Louisa Beaman Young (1850), 9th Wife Of Brigham Young
María Manuela Antonia Jimeno y de la Guerra (1852), first wife of Alfred Sully
Margaret Alley Young (1852), 22nd Wife Of Brigham Young
Albertine Kramer (1852), first wife of Wilhelm Victor Keidel
Elinor Junkin (1854), first wife of Stonewall Jackson
Cecilia Kent Leavitt (1855), mother of Cecilia Beaux
Eliza Polk (1855), first wife of John P. Cochran, 43rd Governor of Delaware
Mary Eulalie Fee Shannon (1855), American poet
Jane McDougal (1862), wife of John McDougal, 2nd Governor of California
 Harriet Mace (1865), second wife of Junius Brutus Booth Jr.
Caroline Kott (1865), second and final wife of Wilhelm Victor Keidel
 Josefa Jaramillo (1868), third and final wife of Kit Carson
Helen L. Gilson (1868), Civil War Nurse
Susannah Lattin (1868), her baby was put up for adoption
 Rhoda Martha Burt Austin (1877), mother of Rhoda Fox Graves
Serena Sabin (1878), mother of Florence R. Sabin
Minnie Warren (1878), entertainer
Abigail May Alcott Nieriker (1879), painter
Clara Adelaide Sharon (1882), first wife of Francis G. Newlands
Mary Nowak (1883), mother of Leon Frank Czolgosz (1873 –1901), the assassin of U.S. President William McKinley
Alice Hathaway Lee Roosevelt (1884), first wife of Theodore Roosevelt
Hattie Eliza Gage (1886), first wife of George Washington Henderson
Cornelia J. Hollar (1887), mother of actor John Hamilton
Awbonnie Tookanka (1888), first wife of Granville Stuart
Elizabeth Donahue Vaughn (1888), first wife of Robert Vaughn
Jennie Louise Benedict (1889), daughter of Henry Flagler
Susan James Parmer (1889), younger sister of Jesse James
Jeanette Guggenheim (1889), daughter of Meyer Guggenheim and aunt of Peggy Guggenheim
 Clara Rudio Pierce (1890), first wife of Walter M. Pierce, later the 17th Governor of Oregon 
Magdalena Schlador Chandler (1892), first wife of Harry Chandler
Alice Jones Porter (1892), mother of Katherine Anne Porter
Josephine Courtney Pruitt (1893), mother of Elinore Pruitt Stewart
Blanche Lehman (1895), only wife of Henri Willis Bendel
Jennie Pond Atwater (1896)
Rosa Fullman (1896), mother of Henry Darger
Martha Wells Shumate (1896), mother of Whitney Shumate
Charlotte Vieux (1897), mother of Jim Thorpe
 Ellen Victoria Cheek Smart (1898), mother of Sonora Smart Dodd
Mary Cowan, serial killer (1898)
Caroline Miskel Hoyt (1898), actress
Anne Purcell Higgins (1899, also died of Tuberculosis), Mother of Margaret Sanger
Nora Wright (1901), first wife of Scott Hayden
Halle Tanner Dillon Johnson (1901), first black female doctor in Alabama
Jessie Octavia Borthwick Pitkin (1901), sister of Mamah Borthwick
Alice Lamon Powers (1906), mother of Chard Powers Smith
the biological mother of John L. Goldwater, one of the three co-founders of Archie Comics
Jean Webster (1916), author
Elnora Dickerson (1916), first wife of Benjamin O. Davis Sr.
the mother of Budd Boetticher (1916)
 Anna Uelsmann (1919), Mother of Maurice Hilleman (she died 2 days after her daughter's stillbirth)
Julia Petta (1921)
Eliza Lacks Pleasant (1924), mother of cancer victim Henrietta Lacks
Pearl Greengard (1925), mother of actress Chris Chase and neuroscientist Paul Greengard. 
Lena Steward (1926), stepmother of George B. Thomas
the biological mother of Katie Myatt of The Moonmaids (1926)
Kay Laurell (1927), actress (initially, she died of pneumonia) 
 Benita Rosalind Guggenheim (1927), sister of Peggy Guggenheim
the mother of Norma Crane (1928)
Virginia Travis (1930), first wife of Robert Johnson
Clare Collins (1930), first wife of Ernest McFarland
Margery Latimer (1932), writer and first wife of Jean Toomer
Nettie Harper (1932), first wife of Thomas A. Dorsey
Caletta Craft (1932), second and last wife of Robert Johnson
the mother of Joe Arpaio (1932)
 Axie Pauline Cox (1933), first wife of Red Foley
Marjorie Frost (1934), daughter of Robert Frost
Edith Roberts, actress, vaudevillian (1935)
Marjorie Oelrichs (1937), socialite
Ruth Harriet Louise (1940), photographer
 Donna Damerel (1941), radio actress for Myrt and Marge and mother of Charles B. Griffith, who was 10 years old at the time. 
Ophelia Ruffin (1941), mother of David Ruffin
Cecilia Mettler (1943), medical historian
Arline Roswell (1946), first wife of Roy Rogers
 Ellee Williams (1949), mother of Irv Cross
Martina von Trapp (1951), was a member of the Trapp Family Singers
 first wife of Johnny Smith (1957)
Mary Welch (1958), stage actress and first wife of David White
 Ellen Urban (1961), first wife of William D. Ruckelshaus
Gerri Santoro (1964)
 Wan-bing Mui (1967), mother of Francis Chan
Nicola Griggs Andron (1975), daughter of David T. Griggs and granddaughter of Robert Fiske Griggs
Rosie Jimenez (1977)
Becky Bell (1988)
Nadine Renee (2004), singer/songwriter
Michal Friedman, singer/voice actress, wife of Dan Green (2011)
Marlise Muñoz (2013)
Chaniece Wallace (2020)

Venezuela
Judith Chacón (2009), weightlifter

Vietnam
Tá Thiên (1807), also known as original name Hồ Thị Hoa. Consort of Nguyễn Phúc Kiểu, the future Minh Mạng Emperor of Nguyễn dynasty and mother of Nguyễn Phúc Miên Tông, the future Thiệu Trị Emperor

See also
Maternal death
Maternal mortality in fiction

References

Childbirth
Died in childbirth

Childbirth